The Australian Aboriginal counting system was used together with message sticks sent to neighbouring clans to alert them of, or invite them to, corroborees, set-fights, and ball games. Numbers could clarify the day the meeting was to be held (in a number of "moons") and where (the number of camps' distance away). The messenger would have a message "in his mouth" to go along with the message stick.

A common misconception among non-Aboriginals is that Aboriginals did not have a way to count beyond two or three.  However, Alfred Howitt, who studied the peoples of southeastern Australia, disproved this in the late nineteenth century, although the myth continues in circulation today.

The system in the table below is that used by the Wotjobaluk of the Wimmera (Howitt used this tribal name for the language called Wergaia in the AIATSIS language map). Howitt wrote that it was common among nearly all peoples he encountered in the southeast: "Its occurrence in these tribes suggests that it must have been general over a considerable part of Victoria". As can be seen in the following tables, names for numbers were based on body parts, which were counted starting from the little finger. In his manuscripts, Howitt suggests counting commenced on the left hand.

Wotjobaluk counting system

{| class="wikitable"
|- bgcolor=#efefef
!Aboriginal name
!literal Translation
!Translation
!Number
|-
|Giti mŭnya
|little hand
|little finger
|1
|-
|Gaiŭp mŭnya
|from gaiŭp = one, mŭnya = hand
|the Ring finger
|2
|-
|Marŭng mŭnya
|from marung = the desert pine (Callitris verrucosa). (i.e., the middle finger being longer than the others, as the desert pine is taller than other trees in Wotjo country.)
|the middle finger
|3
|-
|Yolop-yolop mŭnya
|from yolop = to point or aim 
|index finger
|4
|-
|Bap mŭnya
|from Bap = mother
|the thumb
|5
|-
|Dart gŭr
|from dart = a hollow, and gur = the forearm
|the inside of the wrist
|6
|-
|Boibŭn
|a small swelling (i.e., the swelling of the flexor muscles of the forearm)
|the forearm 
|7
|-
|Bun-darti
|a hollow, referring to the hollow of the inside of the elbow joint
|inside of elbow
|8
|-
|Gengen dartchŭk
|from gengen = to tie, and dartchuk = the upper arm. This name is given also to the armlet of possum pelt which is worn around the upper arm.
|the biceps
|9
|-
|Borporŭng
|
|the point of the shoulder
|10
|-
|Jarak-gourn
|from jarak =  reed, and gourn = neck, (i.e. is, the place where the reed necklace is worn.)
|throat
|11
|-
|Nerŭp wrembŭl
|from nerŭp = the butt or base of anything, and wrembŭl= ear
|earlobe
|12
|-
|Wŭrt wrembŭl''''
|from wŭrt = above and also behind, and wrembŭl = ear
|that part of the just above and behind the ear
|13
|-
|Doke doke|from doka = to move
|
|14
|-
|Det det''
|hard
|crown of the head
|15
|}

A similar system but with one more place was described by Howitt for the Wurundjeri, speakers of the Woiwurrung language, in information given to Howitt by the elder William Barak. He makes it clear that once counting has reached "the top of the head. From this place the count follows the equivalents on the other side."

Other languages

See also
Wurundjeri
Alfred Howitt

References

Bibliography
Howitt, A.W. 1904. The native tribes of south-east Australia. London: McMillan and Co. Reprinted. 1996. Canberra: Aboriginal Studies Press. pp696-699 describe the system in Wotjobaluk, while p700-703 describe the Wurundjeri system.

Australian Aboriginal words and phrases
Numerals